S Scuti is a carbon star located in the constellation Scutum. Parallax measurements by Hipparcos put it at a distance of approximately 1,300 light-years (390 parsecs). Its apparent magnitude is 6.80, making it visible to the naked eye only under excellent conditions.

S Scuti is a semiregular variable star. Its class is SRb, and its pulsation cycle lasts 148 days. S Scuti is also surrounded by a roughly spherical shell of dust. The shell was known earlier from its carbon monoxide emission lines.

References

External links 

Semiregular variable stars
Scutum (constellation)
Objects with variable star designations
Carbon stars
Durchmusterung objects
174325
092442
7089
TIC objects